Manodrome is a 2023 film written and directed by John Trengove and starring Jesse Eisenberg and Adrien Brody. The provocative thriller is Trengove's English language debut. The film premiered at the 73rd Berlin International Film Festival on February 18, 2023, and was produced by Riley Keough and Gina Gammell’s Felix Culpa and  Liminal Content.

Plot 
Manodrome is a film about a New York Uber driver named Ralphie, played by Jesse Eisenberg, who is struggling to make ends meet with his pregnant partner, Sal. Ralphie is introduced to an intense all-male self-help group by a friend, and after suffering a breakdown, he descends into madness, tapping into his destructive and violent instincts.

Cast
Jesse Eisenberg as Ralphie
Adrien Brody
Odessa Young
Ethan Suplee
Philip Ettinger
Georghe Murressean

Riley Keough was initially cast in the role played by Odessa Young.  Keough had to depart the role due to schedule conflicts but remains attached to the film as a producer.

Reception 

Manodrome had its world premiere at the 73rd Berlin International Film Festival and screened February 18, 2023  opening weekend of the Main Competition. The film was nominated for the prestigious Golden Bear, in addition to the Teddy Award for Queer Cinema.

On Rotten Tomatoes, the polarising film has critic rating of 64% based on 11 reviews, with an average rating of 8/10.

The Playlist labeled the film as the "Best Eisenberg offering in over a decade."

Chris Barsanti of Slant Magazine praised Trengove for his cinematic craftsmanship, stating "While Trengrove’s skill is apparent in the slow build of tension, it truly stands out in the arguably more impressive way he holds Ralphie’s view of the world separate from that of the film’s."

Award Daily called the film "A thought-provoking piece of queer filmmaking that should not be missed."

Deadline compared the film to Taxi Driver, writing that its tone and brutal treatment of male violence may not appeal to everyone.

According to The Hollywood Reporter, the film tackles themes of toxic masculinity and power dynamics in relationships through a story of a men's retreat, but its execution is too extreme, and the depiction of a poisonous cult of men whose entitlement is matched by their sense of victimhood can be shocking to some. Jesse Eisenberg's performance as the tightly coiled Ralphie is compelling and rises above the self-seriousness of the movie.

According to Variety, Manodrome struggles to live up to its provocative premise, lacking the depth and nuance needed to effectively explore the state of contemporary masculinity. Despite strong efforts from the composer and lead actor Jesse Eisenberg, the film ultimately fails to deliver something like Fight Club.

Writing for Cineuropa, Davide Abbatescianni described the film's final result as a "captivating pastiche made up of thriller, psychological drama and surreal comedy tropes, filled with crazy twists and turns." "This hodgepodge may be amusing or fascinating to some, but frustrating to others. That being said, viewers certainly should not expect a serious treatment of any of the themes this movie aims to broach," he warned.

Collider review was titled: "Jesse Eisenberg Struggles With Inner Rage in Raw Deconstruction of Masculinity." In summary it said that Manodrome may have its imperfections, but it offers a thoughtful exploration of toxic masculinity and its impact, as well as a strong warning about the dangers of enabling broken men. Jesse Eisenberg delivers a compelling performance, and Adrien Brody is reliably good in his role, making it an overall worthwhile watch despite its flaws.

References

External links
 

2023 films
2020s English-language films
2020s American films
2023 thriller drama films
American thriller drama films
British thriller drama films
2020s British films

de:Manodrome